This is a list of the founding Fellows of the Canadian Academy of Engineering:

 Pierre R. Bélanger
 Lionel Boulet (1919–1996)
 William Boyle
 Angus A. Bruneau
 Donald A. Chisholm (1927–2004)
 J.V. Raymond Cyr
 Camille A. Dagenais
 Alan G. Davenport (1932–2009)
 Colin D. diCenzo (1923–1992)
 John T. Dyment (1904–2000)
 Bernard Etkin
 John S. Foster
 William H. Gauvin (1913–1994)
 Jean-Paul Gourdeau
 George W. Govier
 James M. Ham (1920–1997)
 Richard D. Hiscocks
 Larkin Kerwin  (1924–2004)
 Lesmere F. Kirkpatrick
 Bernard Lamarre
 Philip A. Lapp
 Robert F. Legget (1904–1994)

 Walter F. Light (1923–1996)
 John S. MacDonald
 Gordon M. MacNabb
 James R. McFarlane
 G. Geoffrey Meyerhof
 William G. Morison
 Leopold M. Nadeau
 Barry G. Newman
 Peter Nikiforuk
 John L. Orr
 Alphonse Ouimet (1908–1988)
 Arthur Porter
 W. Howard Rapson
 Lucien Rolland
 Robert F. Shaw
 Leslie W. Shemilt
 Ernest Siddall
 Elvie L. Smith
 Harold A. Smith
 Donald R. Stanley
 John B. Stirling
 Douglas T. Wright

References